The 2020 Colorado House of Representatives elections took place on November 3, 2020, with the primary elections held on June 30, 2020. Voters in all 65 districts of the state House elected their representative for a two-year term. It coincided with the state Senate elections and the biennial United States elections. The Democratic Party retained control of the House of Representatives. The Democrats gained the 38th District while the Republicans gained the 47th District, resulting in no net seat change.

Background
In the previous state House election (2018), the Democrats increased their majority to 17 seats, gaining 5 seats, while the Republicans lost 5 seats. Therefore, for Democrats to have lost their absolute majority in the House in this election, Republicans and other parties would have needed to gain at least 9 more seats.

Incumbents not seeking re-election

Term-limited incumbents
Four Democratic and five Republican incumbents are term-limited and prohibited from seeking a consecutive fifth term.
KC Becker (D), District 13
Perry Buck (R), District 49
Stephen Humphrey (R), District 48
Tracy Kraft-Tharp (D), District 29 
Lois Landgraf (R), District 21
Jovan Melton (D), District 41
Lori Saine (R), District 63
Jonathan Singer (D), District 11
James Wilson (R), District 60

Retiring incumbents
Janet Buckner (D), District 40 (Running for State Senate)
James Coleman (D), District 7 (Running for State Senate)
Sonya Jaquez Lewis (D), District 12 (Running for State Senate)
Larry Liston (R), District 16 (Running for State Senate)

Predictions

Results

Bold - Gain
Italicize - Hold, new member

Closest races 
Seats where the margin of victory was under 10%:
 
 
   
   
  gain

Detailed results

District 1

District 2

District 3

District 4

District 5

District 6

District 7

District 8

District 9

District 10

District 11

District 12

District 13

District 14

District 15

District 16

District 17

District 18

District 19

District 20

District 21

District 22

District 23

District 24

District 25

District 26

District 27

District 28

District 29

District 30

District 31

District 32

District 33

District 34

District 35

District 36

District 37

District 38

District 39

District 40

District 41

District 42

District 43

District 44

District 45

District 46

District 47

District 48

District 49

District 50

District 51

District 52

District 53

District 54

District 55

District 56

District 57

District 58

District 59

District 60

District 61

District 62

District 63

District 64

District 65

References

External links

House of Representatives
Colorado House
Colorado House of Representatives elections